Freedom Force is a real-time tactical role-playing game developed by Irrational Games and published by Electronic Arts and Crave Entertainment in 2002. The player guides a team of superheroes as they defend Patriot City from a variety of villains, monsters, and other menaces. The game's budget was around $2 million. A sequel, Freedom Force vs The 3rd Reich, was self-published in early March 2005. The games were made available on Steam on May 29, 2009.

Setting
Players control the character Mentor across a series of locations and time periods in pursuit of and in contest with the game's primary antagonist, Lord Dominion. The game begins with a fight between Lord Dominion and Mentor resulting in the latter's ship exploding, releasing a substance named "Energy X" over the game's primary setting, Patriot City. The substance acts as a context specific agent that grants an individual superpowers based upon their personality or the environment wherein they made contact with the substance. This substance, "Energy X" acts as the driving plot device for the game as it generates allies for Mentor along with new environments for the player to pursue and fight Lord Dominion.

Comic book tie-in

From January to June 2005, the story of the first Freedom Force game was retold in a six-issue comic book miniseries published by Image Comics. This series was scripted by Eric Dieter and featured Jack Kirby-influenced artwork by Tom Scioli. Dieter also wrote the series "Bible"   and served as community manager for the official website's forum, "Freedom Fans".

Reception

The game received "universal acclaim," according to the review aggregation website Metacritic. GameSpot named it the best computer game of March 2002.

Freedom Force won Computer Gaming Worlds 2002 "Strategy Game of the Year" award. The editors of Computer Games Magazine named it the ninth-best computer game of 2002 and called it "the superhero game fans have been waiting for". It also received the magazine's "Best Voice Acting" award. GameSpot presented it with its annual "Best Story on PC" prize. Freedom Force was also nominated for PC Gamer USs "2002 Best Roleplaying Game", The Electric Playgrounds 2002 "Best Strategy Game for PC" and GameSpots "Best Music on PC", "Biggest Surprise on PC" and "Best Graphics (Artistic) on PC" awards.

Sequel
Freedom Force was followed by a sequel, Freedom Force vs. the Third Reich, which released three years after the original game.

References

External links

 

2002 video games
2K games
Crave Entertainment games
Electronic Arts games
Irrational Games
Multiplayer and single-player video games
NetImmerse engine games
MacOS games
Python (programming language)-scripted video games
Real-time tactics video games
Superhero video games
Cold War video games
Tactical role-playing video games
Take-Two Interactive franchises
Video games about parallel universes
Video games adapted into comics
Video games set in the United States
Windows games
Video games developed in the United States